Andronov is a small lunar impact crater that lies across the southwest rim of the walled plain named Gagarin. It is located on the southern hemisphere of the far side of the Moon, and can not be seen directly from the Earth. Just to the west of Andronov is the crater Levi-Civita.

Andronov is a circular, bowl-shaped formation with a small central floor. There is a tiny craterlet in the northern interior wall. This feature is otherwise unremarkable, and is similar in appearance to many other small craters to be found across the lunar surface.

References

External links
 
 LTO-102B3, Lunar Topographic Orthophotomap, Andronov

Impact craters on the Moon